Torcy-le-Grand is a commune in the Seine-Maritime department in the Normandy region in northern France.

Geography

Heraldry

Population

Places of interest
 The church of St. Ribert, dating from the sixteenth century.
 The remains of a fifteenth-century chateau on an island in the river.

See also
Communes of the Seine-Maritime department

References

External links

Torcy-le-Grand on the Quid website 

Communes of Seine-Maritime